Viscount Langford, of Longford Lodge, was a title in the Peerage of Ireland. It was created on 19 February 1766 for Elizabeth Rowley. She was made Baroness of Summerhill at the same time, also in the Peerage of Ireland. She was the wife of Hercules Langford Rowley, a member of the Irish Privy Council, grandson of Sir John Rowley and Mary, daughter of Sir Hercules Langford, 1st Baronet (see Langford baronets). She was succeeded by her son, the second Viscount. He represented County Antrim and Downpatrick in the Irish Parliament. The title became extinct in 1796 on the death of the second Viscount. The Rowley estates were inherited by Clotworthy Taylor, fourth son of Thomas Taylor, 1st Earl of Bective (whose eldest son was created Marquess of Headfort in 1800) by his wife Jane, daughter of Hercules Langford Rowley and the Viscountess Langford. He assumed by Royal licence the surname of Rowley in 1796 and in 1800 the Langford title was revived when he was raised to the Peerage of Ireland as Baron Langford. This title is still extant.

Viscounts Langford (1766)

Elizabeth Rowley, 1st Viscountess Langford (1713–1791). She was the daughter of Clotworthy Upton (MP in 1695 for the borough of Newton and in 1703 to his death; in June 1725 for the county of Antrim) and Jane Ormsby (daughter of John Ormsby MP of Limerick, born 1632 at Ballyvenogue, Limerick).
Hercules Rowley, 2nd Viscount Langford (1737–1796)

See also
Langford baronets
Baron Langford

References

Extinct viscountcies in the Peerage of Ireland
Noble titles created in 1766